Babushkin Island is a small island lying  north of Archer Point and  east of Matusevich Glacier Tongue, Oates Land, Antarctica. It was mapped by the Soviet Antarctic Expedition (1958) and named for Mikhail Babushkin, a Soviet polar aviator lost in the Arctic.

See also 
 List of Antarctic and sub-Antarctic islands

References 

Islands of Oates Land